Kinnoull is a parish in Perth, Perth and Kinross, Scotland, approximately half a mile northeast of Perth city centre.

The main access roads to Kinnoull from the centre of Perth are Strathmore Street (the A94) and Muirhall Road, both in Bridgend.

Architecture

Although the area is largely residential, Kinnoull is also the home of St Mary's Monastery, which was established in 1869 as the first Roman Catholic monastery to be built in Scotland since the Reformation.

Gannochy
The Robert Matthew Mitchell-designed Gannochy Housing Estate part of Kinnoull was founded by Arthur Kinmond Bell in 1922, when he purchased a large plot of land. At its lower western end, a portion of ground was left for recreational purposes.  A duck pond, tennis court and curling pond were constructed adjacent to the Kinnoull Recreation Grounds on Muirhall Terrace.  The pond still remains, but the tennis court and curling pond have been grassed over and bound on three sides by a copse of trees.  This grassed area, now known as the Curly, can be accessed via a stile gate off Annat Road.

Duck pond
Gannochy duck pond is located at the junction of Annat and Dupplin Roads. (Dupplin Road is named for Viscount Dupplin, the early name of Thomas Hay, 9th Earl of Kinnoull.) In addition to its main inhabitants, it is home to mute swans.

Kinnoull Terrace

Kinnoull Terrace, a cul-de-sac just above the Dundee Road, is home to four villas and one double villa, all of listed status.

Sport
Kinnoull has its own bowling club and adjacent tennis clubs, both established in 1887 as Kinnoull Recreation Club and located on Muirhall Terrace. The tennis club received a Clubmark accreditation in November 2009.

Perth Doo'cot Cricket Club was established in 2012. It plays its home fixtures at Perth Doo'cot Park, on Pitcullen Crescent, which was created by A. K. Bell in 1925. Its season runs from mid-May to the end of August.

Perth Archery Club, which is also based at Doo'cot Park, was founded in 2010.

Notable people
 W. H. Findlay, photographer
 Effie Gray, wife of the critic John Ruskin, is buried in the Kinnoull Parish Church churchyard
 John Hunt, theologian
 James Walter Fairholme, Royal Navy officer and polar explorer lost during the Franklin Expedition

Gallery

References

External links
"Kinnoull Conservation Area Appraisal" – Perth and Kinross Council

Populated places in Perth, Scotland
Parishes in Perthshire